A list of films produced in France in 1929:

See also
1929 in France

References

External links
French films of 1929 on IMDb
French films of 1929 at Cinema-francais.fr

1929
Lists of 1929 films by country or language
Films